Hugh James Hiscutt  (born 10 July 1926) is an Australian former politician.

Life and career
Hiscutt was born in Burnie, Tasmania on 10 July 1926. In 1983 he was elected to the Tasmanian Legislative Council as the independent member for West Devon. He held the seat until he retired in 1995, at which point he was succeeded by his brother Des. His niece by marriage is Leonie Hiscutt, a sitting member of parliament.

In the 2020 Queen's Birthday Honours, Hiscutt was awarded Membership of the Order of Australia in the General Division (AM) for 'significant service to the people and Parliament of Tasmania, and to the community of West Devon'.

References

1926 births
Living people
Independent members of the Parliament of Tasmania
Members of the Order of Australia
Members of the Tasmanian Legislative Council